Xaveer De Geyter (born 1957) is a Belgian architect.

De Geyter was born in Doornik, Belgium.

He spent ten years at office for metropolitan architecture with Rem Koolhaas, where he worked on projects such as the Villa dall'ava in Paris, "urban design, melun sénart paris", the sea terminal in Zeebrugge, the zkm centre for art & media technology in Karlsruhe and two libraries for Jussieu University, Paris.

De Geyter started his own firm in the early 1990s and built two private villas in Belgium.

Early designs such as the Ilot Saint Maurice in Lille and the Chassé Apartment towers, Breda, exemplify his capacity for innovative architectural design. In 2001, a second office opened in Ghent, in collaboration with Stéphane Beel.

Recent projects
Coovi, planning and building for Elishout Campus, 2003
Monaco, extension of the city in the sea, 2002
Ghent University, two buildings and facility, 2001
Paju Book city, office building with photo studio, Seoul Korea, 2001
MAS Anvers, historical museum Antwerp, competition, 1999
Ilôt Saint Maurice, urban study with a mixed-program housing-shop-offices in Euralille (Lille),
Pont du Gard in Nîmes, tourist accommodation and public space organisation, collaboration with Maarten van Severen Design, 1999
Chassée Park appartements, 5 housing towers with parking, Breda (Netherlands) 1996–2001

References

External links
Official page

Belgian architects
1957 births
Living people